Gródek nad Dunajcem  ("Little Town on the Dunajec") is a village in southern Poland situated in the Lesser Poland Voivodeship since 1999 (it was previously in Nowy Sącz Voivodeship from 1975-1998).

See also
Dunajec River
Nowy Targ
Zakopane

Villages in Nowy Sącz County